V. V. Voevodsky Institute of Chemical Kinetics and Combustion of the Siberian Branch of the RAS, ICKC SB RAS is a research institute in Novosibirsk, Russia. It was founded in 1957.

History
The institute was founded in 1957. Its team was formed of scientists led by A. A. Kovalsky and V. V. Voevodsky.

In 2002, the number of employees was 284.

Activities
The study of combustion mechanisms in gas and condensed phases, the processes of formation and distribution of aerosols etc. The Institute has developed methods for high-resolution radiospectroscopy and methods for the filtration combustion of gases. It created aerosol technologies for the protection of crops and forests.

Awards
The works of the institute staff were awarded the USSR Council of Ministers Prize (1985), the Lenin Prize (1986), two USSR State Prizes (1968, 1988) and the State Prize of the Russian Federation (1994).

References

External links
 Институт химической кинетики и горения им. В. В. Воеводского СО РАН. СО РАН.

Research institutes in Novosibirsk
Chemical research institutes
1957 establishments in the Soviet Union
Research institutes established in 1957
Research institutes in the Soviet Union